Haianari Creek is a west bank tributary of the Demerara River in Upper Demerara-Berbice, Guyana.  It enters the Demerara River 90 miles upstream of the Demerara's mouth.

It is categorized as a stream.

References 
Rivers of Guyana

External links 
Issue of a wood-cutting license for the right bank of Hainari Creek from the Dept. of Lands and Mines, British Guiana (1915)